The 2022 Nippon Professional Baseball season was the 73rd season of professional baseball in Japan since Nippon Professional Baseball (NPB) was reorganized in 1950. There are 12 NPB teams, split evenly between the Central League and Pacific League.

On April 10, Chiba Lotte Marines pitcher Rōki Sasaki threw a perfect game, the first in 28 years and the 16th in NPB history. Sasaki tied an existing NPB record by striking out 19 batters, and set a new record by striking out 13 consecutive batters.

Including Sasaki's perfect game, for the first time since 1940, there were five no-hitters this season, with Nao Higashihama of the Fukuoka SoftBank Hawks throwing one on May 11 against the Saitama Seibu Lions, Shōta Imanaga of the Yokohama DeNA BayStars doing so on June 7th during interleague play against the Hokkaido Nippon-Ham Fighters (also being the first no hitter in the history of the Sapporo Dome in its final season as the home of the Fighters), and Yoshinobu Yamamoto of the Orix Buffaloes throwing one also against the Lions on June 18. One was nearly thrown on July 20, with rookie Ren Mukunoki of the Buffaloes nearly doing so against the Fighters, but he fell 1 strike short, as he gave up a hit to Fighters infielder Ryusei Satoh, in which fans called as a similar incident to former MLB pitcher Dave Stieb, in which he lost a perfect game and a no hitter in the same game with only 1 strike to go. A 5th one would eventually be thrown on August 27 by Cody Ponce of the Hokkaido Nippon-Ham Fighters against the Fukuoka SoftBank Hawks, in just his 2nd start, tying 2022 with 1940 with the most no-hitters in a season in Japanese pro baseball history, as well as becoming the first foreign player since Rick Guttormson of the Tokyo Yakult Swallows in 2006 to throw a no-hitter, and the first Pacific League foreign player to do so since the now late Narciso Elvira did so with the Osaka Kintetsu Buffaloes in 2000.

The Tokyo Yakult Swallows took home the Central League pennant for the second year in a row over the Yokohama DeNA BayStars while the Orix Buffaloes took the Pacific League pennant over the Fukuoka SoftBank Hawks via the first pennant tiebreaker in NPB history.

Regular season standings

Interleague

Climax Series

First stage

Central League

Pacific League

Final Stage
The series started with a 1–0 advantage for the first-placed team.

Central League

Pacific League

Japan Series

See also
2022 in baseball
2022 Major League Baseball season
2022 KBO League season
2022 Chinese Professional Baseball League season

References

 
Nippon Professional Baseball season
Nippon Professional Baseball season